OTT were an Irish boy band of the mid-late 1990s. The five members were Niall O'Neill, Alan Fitzsimons, Alan Mates (known as 'Adam' in the band), Glen Clarke and Keith Cox. They were signed to Sony Music and had a number of chart hits in Ireland and the UK. After three top ten single releases in Ireland, they attempted to break the UK market minus Keith Cox, who had left for family reasons. Although moderately successful in the UK, the band became well known in Asia with sales of up to 250,000 copies of their debut album. After being dropped by Sony in the late 1990s, the band called it a day. O'Neill now runs a multi-media company in Dublin, having worked at a Spanish tourist resort, Fitzsimons works in the Mobile Communications industry, Mates is an Interior Designer, and Clarke lives in the United States.

Discography

Album
1997: This One's for You

Singles
1995: "Promise Me"
1996: "I Can't Give You Anything (But My Love)" - IRE #10
1996: "Let Me In" - IRE #2
1996: "All Out of Love" - IRE #3
1996: "Forever Girl" - IRE #14
1997: "Let Me In" (re-issue) - UK #12
1997: "Forever Girl" (re-issue) - UK #24
1997: "All Out of Love" (re-issue) - UK #11
1998: "The Story of Love" - UK #11, IRE #9

After OTT
OTT's Alan Fitzsimons competed in the first series of TV talent series The Voice of Ireland, being eliminated in the semi-finals.

References

Irish boy bands
Irish pop music groups
Musical groups established in 1995
Musical groups disestablished in 1998
Musical groups from Dublin (city)